Brian P. Hanley (born c. 1957) is an American microbiologist and founder of Butterfly Sciences. He is known for self-experimenting with gene therapy to try to improve health span.

Biography 
Early in his research career, Hanley’s areas of study were biodefense and terrorism. He contributed chapters to two books about these subjects. Hanley obtained a PhD in Microbiology from University of California, Davis in 2009. The same year, he founded Butterfly Sciences in Davis, California to develop a gene therapy to treat HIV AIDS using a combination of GHRH and an intracellular vaccine.

After founding Butterfly Sciences, Hanley continued publishing scholarly literature in multiple fields that examined economic topics such as banking, cryptocurrency and climate.

During the COVID-19 pandemic, with Steve Keen and George Church, Hanley also contributed to literature about public health strategy in response to the pandemic.

Self-experimentation 
Hanley could not raise money for his company Butterfly Sciences and decided to obtain proof of concept by testing gene therapy on himself.  Hanley said: “I wanted to prove it, I wanted to do it for myself, and I wanted to make progress.” He designed the plasmid containing a gene coding for growth hormone–releasing hormone and had it made by a scientific supply company for around $10,000. However, the total cost of development was over $500,000.

He said that he corresponded with the FDA prior to starting his self-experimentation, and that the FDA told him he needed to file and get approval for an Investigational New Drug (IND) application, but Hanley did not agree that he needed FDA approval and proceeded without it. Hanley later co-authored a 2019 paper on Self-Experimentation, ethics and law with George Church, which bears out his position regarding the necessity for an IND. He did not perform any animal tests before testing the plasmid on himself, but won institutional review board (IRB) approval regardless on his proposed clinical research plans.

A physician assisted in administration of the plasmid to Hanley's thigh using electroporation. The plasmids were administered twice: once in summer 2015 and a second larger dose in July 2016.

Hanley claims the treatment has helped him. He reported that his white blood cell count and testosterone increased and his LDL levels dropped.

A researcher at George Church’s Harvard University laboratory observed the experiment and Hanley’s blood was then studied, The scientific results were published in December 2021, coauthored with George Church.

Transgender research 
Hanley published an article in 2011 providing a biological explanation for transgender identity and homosexuality.

Selected publications 

 
 
 
 
 Brian P Hanley (2014) Radiation – Exposure and its treatment: A modern handbook

See also

References

External links 
 Official website of Butterfly Sciences

American transhumanists
1950s births
People from Davis, California
Living people
American microbiologists
Biogerontologists
Gene therapy
University of California, Davis alumni